Snorre Harstad (born 24 January 1971) is a retired Norwegian football defender.

He played youth football for Rælingen FK. He left the club for Holter IF ahead of the 1997 season. He later played 34 games for Eidsvold Turn in 1999 and 2000. In 2017 he sign for Bjerke IL. In the season 2018 and 2019 he has been the captain for the team.

He is married to Katrine Moholt, and they live in Nannestad.

References

1971 births
Living people
Norwegian footballers
Lillestrøm SK players
People from Akershus
Association football defenders
Sportspeople from Viken (county)